Mika Hilander (born 17 August 1983) is a Finnish former football player who played as a goalkeeper.

He has played for Tampere United, KuPS, Ilves and FC Haka in Veikkausliiga, and for NoPS, PP-70 and TPV in lower divisions.

Honours

Individual
Veikkausliiga Goalkeeper of the Year: 2019
Veikkausliiga Team of the Year: 2019

References

External links
  Profile at veikkausliiga.com
 

1983 births
Living people
Finnish footballers
Tampere United players
Kuopion Palloseura players
FC Haka players
Veikkausliiga players
Association football goalkeepers
Finland international footballers
Footballers from Tampere